Modern is a district in eastern Timișoara. It was built between 1970–1990.

Transport 
  Bus: E4, E4B, E8, M30
  Tram: 1
  Trolleybus: M11

References 

Districts of Timișoara